The enzyme triacetate-lactonase (EC 3.1.1.38) catalyzes the reaction

triacetate lactone + H2O  triacetate

This enzyme belongs to the family of hydrolases, specifically those acting on carboxylic ester bonds.  The systematic name is triacetolactone lactonohydrolase. Other names in common use include triacetic lactone hydrolase, triacetic acid lactone hydrolase, TAL hydrolase, and triacetate lactone hydrolase.

References

 

EC 3.1.1
Enzymes of unknown structure